Dioura is a village and seat of the commune of Karéri in the Cercle of Ténenkou in the Mopti Region of southern-central Mali.

History
On March 16–17, 2019, gunmen attacked a Malian army base in Dioura, killing at least sixteen soldiers.

References

Populated places in Mopti Region